The 2018 National Collegiate Athletic Association (NCAA) Division I Football Championship Subdivision (FCS) football rankings consists of two human polls, in addition to various publications' preseason polls. Unlike the Football Bowl Subdivision (FBS), college football's governing body, the NCAA, bestows the national championship title through a 24-team tournament. The following weekly polls determine the top 25 teams at the NCAA Division I Football Championship Subdivision level of college football for the 2018 season. The STATS poll is voted by media members while the Coaches' Poll is determined by coaches at the FCS level.

The STATS preseason poll was released on August 6, 2018, with defending champions North Dakota State earning 151 of the 157 allotted first-place votes; defending runners-up James Madison earned the other six.

The Coaches' poll was released on August 13, 2018 - it consisted of an identical top six, with defending champions North Dakota State receiving 23 of the 26 first-place votes.

Legend

STATS Poll

AFCA Coaches' Poll

References

Rankings
NCAA Division I FCS football rankings